OAPI may refer to:

 Organisation Africaine de la Propriété Intellectuelle, the African Intellectual Property Organization
 Online Abuse Prevention Initiative